Sverre Martin Fjelstad (born 17 October 1930) is a Norwegian zoologist, photographer, non-fiction writer and producer for radio and television. He was born in Oslo. He is probably best known to the public for the series Naturmagasinet, which was aired by the Norwegian Broadcasting Corporation between 1966 and 1974.

References

1930 births
Living people
Scientists from Oslo
Photographers from Oslo
20th-century Norwegian zoologists
Norwegian television presenters
NRK people
Television people from Oslo